Ratu Veremalua Taukanoa Vugakoto, also known as Tuvere Vugakoto (born 29 December 1997) is a Fijian rugby player who plays for the Utah Warriors in Major League Rugby (MLR).

He previously played for Fijian Latui in Global Rapid Rugby and the Fijian national rugby team. He was educated at Nelson College in New Zealand, where he played for the school's 1st XV rugby team. His primary position is hooker.

In August 2019, he was named to Fiji's squad for the 2019 Rugby World Cup.

References

External links 
 

1997 births
Living people
Fijian rugby union players
Rugby union hookers
Fiji international rugby union players
Fijian Drua players
Utah Warriors players
People educated at Nelson College